Poladlı (also, Poladı and Poladly) is a village and municipality in the Gadabay Rayon of Azerbaijan.  It has a population of 1,363.  The municipality consists of the villages of Poladlı, Qozqaralı, Əmir, Kələman, Hacıalılar, and Heriknaz.

References 

Populated places in Gadabay District